The Asian Men's Volleyball Cup, also known as the AVC Cup for Men, is an international volleyball competition in Asia and Oceania contested by the top senior men's national teams of the members of Asian Volleyball Confederation (AVC), the sport's continent governing body. The tournaments have been awarded every two years since 2008. The current champion is China, which won its second title at the 2022 tournament.

The 7 Asian Volleyball Cup tournaments have been won by four different national teams. Iran have won three times. The other Asian Cup winners are China, with two titles; and both South Korea and Qatar, with one title each.

The 2022 Asian Cup was to take place in Taipei, Taiwan but because of its strict COVID-19 protocols, it was reallocated to Nakhon Pathom, Thailand.

This event should not be confused with the other, continental competition for Asian national volleyball teams, the Asian Volleyball Championship and Asian Volleyball Challenge Cup.

Results summary

Teams reaching the top four

Champions by region

Hosts
List of hosts by number of cups hosted.

Medal summary

Participating nations
Legend
 – Champions
 – Runners-up
 – Third place
 – Fourth place
 – Did not enter / Did not qualify
 – Hosts
Q – Qualified for forthcoming tournament

Debut of teams

Awards

Former awards

See also
 Asian Women's Volleyball Cup
 Asian Men's Volleyball Challenge Cup
 Asian Men's Volleyball Championship
 Volleyball at the Asian Games
 Asian Men's U23 Volleyball Championship
 Asian Men's U20 Volleyball Championship
 Asian Boys' U18 Volleyball Championship

References

External links
 Asian Volleyball Confederation – official website
 AVC Competition Results

 
V
International volleyball competitions
International men's volleyball competitions
Volleyball competitions in Asia
Biennial sporting events
2008 establishments in Asia
Asian Volleyball Confederation competitions